Highway 953 is a provincial highway in the Canadian province of Saskatchewan. It runs from Highway 952 to Highway 2.

Highway 953 passes through the communities of Emma Lake, Sunnyside Beach, Clearsand Beach, Neis Beach, McPhail Cove, and Anglin Lake. Highway 953 also provides access to the lakes of Emma, Christopher, Blanche, and Anglin as well as the Anglin Lake Recreation Site section of Great Blue Heron Provincial Park.

See also 
Roads in Saskatchewan
Transportation in Saskatchewan

References 

953